Santoshi Maa may refer to:

 Santoshi Mata, Hindu goddess
 Santoshi Maa (TV series), a 2015 TV series 
 Jai Santoshi Maa, 1975 Bollywood film
 Santoshi Maa - Sunayein Vrat Kathayein, a 2019 Indian Hindi language mythological television series

See also 
 Rajkumar Santoshi, Bollywood filmmaker 
 Santoshi Matsa, Indian weightlifter